Jaimovich-Rebelo preferences refer to a utility function that allows to parameterize the strength of short-run wealth effects on the labor supply, originally developed by Nir Jaimovich and Sergio Rebelo in their 2009 article Can News about the Future Drive the Business Cycle?

Let  denote consumption and let  denote hours worked at period . The instantaneous utility has the form

where

The agents in the model economy maximize their lifetime utility, defined over sequences of consumption and hours worked,

Relationship to other common macroeconomic preference types 
Jaimovich-Rebelo preferences nest the KPR preferences and the GHH preferences.

KPR preferences 

When , the scaling variable  reduces to

and the instantaneous utility simplifies to

corresponding to the KPR preferences.

GHH preferences and balanced growth path 

When , and if the economy does not present exogenous growth, then the scaling variable  reduces to a constant

and the instantaneous utility simplifies to

corresponding to the original GHH preferences, in which the wealth effect on the labor supply is completely shut off.

To reconcile these facts, first note that the Jaimovich-Rebelo preferences are compatible with a balanced growth path for  because the scaling variable, grows at the same rate as the labor augmenting technology.

Let  denote the level of labor augmenting technology. When , the stationary variable  satisfies the relation

which implies that

for some constant .

Then, the instantaneous utility simplifies to

consistent with the shortcut of introducing a scaling factor containing the level of labor augmenting technology before the hours worked term.

References

Business cycle theories